The Buckeye Dream Machine is an American powered parachute that was designed and produced by Buckeye Industries, introduced in 1985. Now out of production, when it was available the aircraft was supplied as a complete ready-to-fly-aircraft, as a kit, in the form of plans for amateur construction.

Design and development
The aircraft was designed as a two-place ultralight trainer. It features a parachute-style high-wing, two seats in tandem, tricycle landing gear and a single  Rotax 503 engine in pusher configuration. The  Rotax 582 liquid-cooled engine was a factory option.

The aircraft is built from a combination of bolted aluminium and 4130 steel tubing. In flight steering is accomplished via foot pedals that actuate the canopy brakes, creating roll and yaw. On the ground the aircraft has lever-controlled nosewheel steering. The main landing gear incorporates spring rod suspension. The aircraft was factory supplied in the form of an assembly kit that requires 30–40 hours to complete.

Operational history
By 1998 the company reported that 300 kits had been sold and were completed and flying.

The design won Best in Category and both AirVenture and Sun 'n Fun and Grand Champion - Powered Parachutes" at the EAA Northwest Fly-In at Arlington, Washington.

Specifications (Dream Machine)

References

1990s United States ultralight aircraft
Single-engined pusher aircraft
Powered parachutes